Ronnie Turnbull (18 July 1922 – 17 November 1966) was an English footballer who played as a centre forward.

He played junior football in Scotland during the Second World War with Jeanfield Swifts before joining Dundee in 1944. He was transferred to Sunderland for a fee of £10,000 in November 1947, scoring four goals on his debut for the club. He made 40 appearances, scoring 16 goals, before moving on to Manchester City in September 1949. He was then signed by Swansea Town for a fee of £7,500 in January 1951, where he was the club's top goalscorer for two consecutive seasons.

After retiring, he lived and worked in Sunderland. He died in November 1966 after suffering a heart-attack.

References

External links
 

1922 births
1966 deaths
English footballers
Association football forwards
Dundee F.C. players
Sunderland A.F.C. players
Manchester City F.C. players
Swansea City A.F.C. players
Jeanfield Swifts F.C. players
English Football League players
Scottish Football League players
Ashington A.F.C. players
Scottish Junior Football Association players
People from Newbiggin-by-the-Sea
Footballers from Northumberland